Traffic Shaper XP is a traffic shaping utility for the Windows operating system, which can be used to control the rate at which specific programs upload/download data.

Criticism 
The free version of the software only supports a maximum of five rules and ten addresses and limits network traffic to 3,687 kbit/s.

Similar products
NetLimiter
cFosSpeed

References

External links
 

Internet Protocol based network software
Utilities for Windows